Buczynski is a surname. Notable people with the surname include:

 Eddie Buczynski (1947–1989), American Wiccan and archaeologist
 Walter Buczynski (born 1933), Canadian composer
 Wieslaw Buczynski, former Poland international rugby footballer, and coach of Malmo RC
 Michele Buczynski, actress in A Fine Romance (film)

See also
 8166 Buczynski, minor planet

Surnames of Polish origin
Polish-language surnames